Fisher Communications was a media company in the United States. Based in Seattle, Washington, the company primarily owned a number of radio and television stations in the Western United States. It was the last company in the Seattle area to own a local TV station before being acquired by Sinclair Broadcast Group. Fisher was acquired the same year KOMO-TV's competitor KING-TV's owner, Belo, was acquired by the Gannett Company.

History
See also KNWN (AM)

Fisher Companies, Inc.'s Fisher Communications by 1998 owned 25 radio stations and 2 TV stations.  Fisher Companies also owned a flour milling and food distribution company and real estate development subsidiary.
 
In 1999 Retlaw Enterprises sold its remaining 11 television stations to Fisher Communications, including all of the related assets to those properties for $215 million in cash. Its broadcasting unit, until the 2000s, was Fisher Broadcasting. Also that year, Fisher is launching its own entertainment division, Fisher Entertainment, to be headed by Alan Winters, a syndication executive.

Fisher began to sell many of its properties in the mid-2000s, including real estate, its longtime flour milling operation, and its stake in Safeco. By 2011, Fisher Communications was down to 10 radio stations. On April 11, 2013, Fisher (which by then owned 20 television stations and only three radio stations) announced that it would be acquired by the Sinclair Broadcast Group. However, the deal was subject to financial scrutiny; the law firm Levi & Korsinsky notified Fisher shareholders with accusations that Fisher's board of directors were breaching fiduciary duties by "failing to adequately shop the Company before agreeing to enter into the transaction", and Sinclair was underpaying for Fisher's stock. Shortly after the announcement, a lawsuit was filed by a Fisher shareholder; the suit was settled in July 2013, on August 6 Fisher's shareholders approved the merger. The FCC granted its approval of the sale of August 7. On August 8, Sinclair announced that the sale was completed.

Former Fisher-owned stations

Radio stations

Television stations 
(From 2001 to 2008, Washington, Oregon, and Idaho ABC and CBS stations used a logo having a blue rectangle with the TV number in the rectangle and lowercase call signs on the top.)

Stations are arranged alphabetically by state and by city of license.

Notes:
 (**) - Indicates a station built and signed-on by Fisher.
 (++) - Indicates a station owned by Retlaw Enterprises, prior to its acquisition by Fisher in 1999.

Other Note:
 1 Owned by Roberts Media, LLC, Fisher operated KMTR under a shared services agreement with KVAL.

Contract Dispute 
On December 17, 2008, Fisher Communications' contract expired with Dish Network. As a result of this contract dispute, stations owned by Fisher Communications were no longer available to Dish Network subscribers.  Dish Network claimed that Fisher is asking for over an 80% increase.
The Fisher stations that returned to Dish Network are: KOMO and KUNS in Seattle.; KATU and KUNP in Portland.; KIMA in Yakima, Washington.; KVAL in Eugene, Oregon.; KBCI (now KBOI) in Boise, Idaho; KIDK in Idaho Falls, Idaho; and KBAK and KBFX in Bakersfield, California. Dish Network restored the service to their customers at 10:25 p.m. PST on June 10.

References 

Defunct companies based in Seattle
Economy of the Northwestern United States
Defunct broadcasting companies of the United States
Sinclair Broadcast Group
Companies formerly listed on the Nasdaq
2013 disestablishments in Washington (state)
Mass media companies disestablished in 2013
2013 mergers and acquisitions